Jonathan Gruber may refer to:

 Jonathan Gruber (economist), American academic, educator; Patient Protection and Affordable Care Act co-architect
 Jonathan Gruber (filmmaker) (Follow Me: The Yoni Netanyahu Story)
 J. Mackye Gruber, American screenwriter

See also
 John Gruber (born 1973), American technology pundit